Francois Robert "Rob" de Castella  (born 27 February 1957) is an Australian former world champion marathon runner.

De Castella is widely known as "Deek" or "Deeks" to the Australian public, and "Tree" to his competitors due to his thick legs and inner calm. He holds the Oceanic record for the marathon.

Early life
De Castella is of French and Swiss-French descent. His family were part of both the French nobility and Swiss nobility. He was born in Melbourne, Victoria, the eldest of seven children. Sport was a way of life in his family – his father Rolet ran marathons in the 1950s. His mother Anne was a state-level tennis player. His brother Nicholas, took part in four World Cross Country Championships, whereas brother Anthony competed in running at club level for more than 25 years. Rob de Castella was an outstanding track athlete as a teenager and trained under Pat Clohessy from the age of 11.

Marathon career

1981 Fukuoka Marathon
De Castella first came to international attention when he won the 1981 Fukuoka Marathon in a time of 2:08:18, which was the fastest time recorded for an out-and-back course. It was not initially known to be a world best time, because his time was 5 seconds slower than the time set by Alberto Salazar in the 1981 New York City Marathon. It later emerged that the New York course was about 148 metres short. De Castella's time was later ratified as the world record.

1982 Commonwealth Games Marathon
De Castella was the favourite to win the marathon at the 1982 Commonwealth Games in Brisbane. At the start of the race, Tanzanians Gidamis Shahanga and Juma Ikangaa raced to the lead and were 50 m ahead of the pack after five minutes. After the 20 km mark, this gap had widened to several hundred meters. At the halfway mark, De Castella developed diarrhoea. In 100% humidity, he let go of his bowels and signalled for some damp towels from his crew members. By the 23 km mark, Ikangaa had taken the lead from his compatriot, with de Castella in the main pack some 250 m behind but closing. De Castella passed the now-tiring Shahanga at the 38 km mark, and in the next kilometre drew level with Ikangaa and then took the lead. However, Ikangaa was not done yet, and he re-took the lead slightly. The duel continued for the remainder of the race. Eventually, de Castella pulled away and won by 80 metres in a time of 2:09:18, 12 seconds ahead of Ikangaa. Briton Mike Gratton finished third in 2:12:06, and Shahanga faded to finish 6th. The race finished on the streets of Brisbane, not in the main stadium.

1983 Rotterdam Marathon
In April 1983, De Castella defeated a deep field to win the Rotterdam Marathon. The race was billed as a clash between de Castella and Salazar, who at the time was undefeated, and was also televised live back to Australia. De Castella dropped all of the field except Carlos Lopes (who would win the Olympic marathon the next year), and defeated Lopes in a sprint for the finish, winning in a time of 2:08:37. De Castella's time was, at that point, the fourth fastest in history.

1983 IAAF World Championships

De Castella won Australia's first athletic World Championships gold medal when he won the marathon in August 1983, beating Ethiopian Kebede Balcha by 24 seconds and Olympic champion Waldemar Cierpinski by 34 seconds.

1984 Olympic Games
De Castella was the favourite for the 1984 Summer Olympics marathon. He ran in a leading group of ten until about the 35  kilometres mark, when at a drink station, six leading runners picked up speed and de Castella could not keep up. He caught some of the leaders during the final kilometres, and finished fifth.

1986 Commonwealth Games
De Castella defended his Commonwealth Games title in Edinburgh, winning in 2:10:15.

Cross country running
In addition to marathon running, de Castella was also an accomplished cross country runner. He won the Australian national title once as a junior and four times as a senior, along with five other podium finishes. He competed eight times at the World Cross Country Championships from 1977 to 1986, finishing in the top 20 five times.

Post career and life
De Castella failed to finish the marathon at the 1987 World Athletics Championships. He represented Australia at the 1988 Seoul and 1992 Barcelona Olympics, competing in four straight Olympic Games. He finished in the top ten in three Olympics, but never won a medal.

He retired from the sport in 1993 and lives in Canberra, together with his wife Theresa and four children. Previously he was married to the former champion triathlete Gaylene Clews. He lost his family home, along with many of his medals and other citations, in the 2003 Canberra bushfires. Choosing to move rather than rebuild, he now lives in a nearby suburb. He later helped with the taskforce established for the reconstruction of areas worst affected by the fires.

From 1990 to 1995, de Castella was the director of the Australian Institute of Sport and subsequently became executive director of Focus On You, a company focusing on corporate and community health and fitness. He has also been actively involved in other organisations dedicated to encouraging healthy living for both children and adults. He also fronts the Indigenous Marathon Project. In 2014 he was made an Officer of the Order of Australia at the Australia Day honours.

In 2003, de Castella launched "deeks", a specialist chain of grain and gluten free bakeries & cafés. In 2004, he earned a black belt in the traditional Okinawan Goju Ryu; he has also been part of a long-running advertising campaign for the multi-vitamin tablet "Centrum".

Results 
 1977 – won the Sydney City to Surf in 41' 12"
 1979 – won the Victorian Championship in 2h 14'44" and the Australian marathon title in 2h 13'23"
 1980 – 10th in the 1980 Summer Olympics marathon in Moscow, 2h 14'31"; 8th at the Fukuoka Marathon in 2h 10'44"
 1981 – won the Fukuoka Marathon in 2h 08'18" (world record from 1981 to 1984)
 1981 – won and set fastest time of 40'08" in City to Surf, Sydney. (this time bettered in 1991)
 1982 – won the 1982 Commonwealth Games marathon in Brisbane in 2h 09'18"
 1983 – won the Rotterdam Marathon in 2h 08'37"
 1983 – won the 1983 World Championships in Athletics marathon in Helsinki in 2h 10'03"
 1984 – 5th in the Olympic Marathon in Los Angeles in 2h 11'09"
 1984 – 3rd in the Chicago Marathon in 2h 09'09"
 1985 – 3rd in the Chicago Marathon in 2h 08'48"
 1986 – won the 1986 Commonwealth Games marathon in Edinburgh in 2h 10'15"
 1986 – won the Boston marathon in 2h 07'51" (personal best)
 1987 – won the Great North Run in 1h 02'04"
 1988 – 4th in the Tokyo International Marathon in 2h 08'49"
 1988 – 8th in the 1988 Summer Olympics marathon in Seoul in 2h 13'07"
 1990 – 13th in the 1990 Commonwealth Games marathon in 2h 18'50"
 1991 – won the Rotterdam Marathon in 2h 09'42"
 1992 – finished 26th in Olympic Marathon, Barcelona in 2h 17'44"

Records
As of May 2009, de Castella still held the following records:
 Australian U20 10,000 m – 28'54"4 on 16 December 1976 in Melbourne
 Australian 20 km Track – 58.37.2 on 17 April 1982 in Rome
 Australian 1 hr – 20,516 m on 17 April 1982 in Rome
 Australian All Comers Marathon – 2h 09'18" in Brisbane Commonwealth Games 1982
 Australian Marathon – 2h 07'51" at the 1986 Boston Marathon

Other awards 
1982 – Member of the Order of the British Empire in recognition of service to athletics.
1983 – Australian of the Year
1985 – Sport Australia Hall of Fame
2000 – Australian Sports Medal for significant contribution as a competitor (Athletics).
2001 – Centenary Medal service to the sport of athletics and to sports administration.
2001 – Australian Institute of Sport 'Best of the Best'
2014 – Officer of the Order of Australia for distinguished service to the community through programs promoting children's health and fitness, as a supporter and mentor of young Indigenous men and women, and to marathon running.

References

External links 

 
 
 
 
 

1957 births
Living people
Athletes from Melbourne
Australian male long-distance runners
Australian male marathon runners
Olympic male marathon runners
Olympic athletes of Australia
Athletes (track and field) at the 1980 Summer Olympics
Athletes (track and field) at the 1984 Summer Olympics
Athletes (track and field) at the 1988 Summer Olympics
Athletes (track and field) at the 1992 Summer Olympics
Commonwealth Games gold medallists for Australia
Commonwealth Games gold medallists in athletics
Robert
Athletes (track and field) at the 1982 Commonwealth Games
Athletes (track and field) at the 1986 Commonwealth Games
Athletes (track and field) at the 1990 Commonwealth Games
World Athletics Championships athletes for Australia
World Athletics Championships medalists
World Athletics Championships winners
Australian Athletics Championships winners
Japan Championships in Athletics winners
Boston Marathon male winners
World record setters in athletics (track and field)
Australian Members of the Order of the British Empire
Officers of the Order of Australia
Recipients of the Australian Sports Medal
Recipients of the Centenary Medal
Sport Australia Hall of Fame inductees
Australian of the Year Award winners
People educated at Xavier College
Australian Institute of Sport track and field athletes
Australian Institute of Sport administrators
Australian people of Swiss-Italian descent
Commonwealth Games competitors for Australia
Australian republicans
Medallists at the 1982 Commonwealth Games